Rohit Dahiya (born 31 March 1988) is an Indian first-class cricketer who plays for Gujarat.

References

External links
 

1988 births
Living people
Indian cricketers
Gujarat cricketers
Cricketers from Haryana